The  is a limited express train service in Japan operated by the West Japan Railway Company (JR West) since July 2001. It runs from Tottori and Yonago to Shin-Yamaguchi.

Stops

Trains stop at the following stations:

 -  -  -  -  - - -  -  - -  - -  - -  -  -  -  -  -  -  - 

Stations in brackets indicate stations where not all trains stop at.

Rolling stock
Super Oki services are normally formed of two-car KiHa 187 series tilting DMU sets, sometimes lengthened to three or four cars during busy seasons. One car consists of reserved seating, and the other is non-reserved. No Green Car is available on this train.

Formation
Two-car trains are formed as shown below, with car 1 at the Shin-Yamaguchi end. All cars are no-smoking.

History
The Super Oki was introduced on 7 July 2001.

References

External links

 KiHa 187 series Super Oki information (JR West) 

Named passenger trains of Japan
West Japan Railway Company
Railway services introduced in 2001